The 2007–09 International Challenge Trophy was the second edition of the International Challenge Trophy. It was contested by eight teams which were divided into two groups of four. The two group winners  - Belgium U-21 and England C qualified for the final. Belgium U-21 won the competition after beating England C 2-0 in the final.

Group A

Matches

Final Table

Group B

Matches

Final Table

Final

Statistics

Goalscorers

References

International Challenge Trophy
Chall
Chall